Gurla Mandhata, also Naimona'nyi or Nemo Nani, is the highest peak of the Nalakankar Himal, a small subrange of the Himalaya. It is named after king Mandhata of suryavansha of Ikshvaku dynasty. It lies in Burang County of the Ngari Prefecture in the Tibet Autonomous Region of China, near the northwest corner of Nepal. It is the 34th-highest peak in the world (using a 500-metre prominence cutoff). It is also notable for being well within the interior of the Tibetan Plateau (most peaks of similar height – except notably Shishapangma, the world's 14th-highest peak – lie nearer to or outside the edge of the Plateau) and relatively far away from other peaks with heights greater than 7,500 metres. It sits roughly across Lake Manasarovar from the sacred peak of Mount Kailash. The Tibetan name, Naimona'nyi, is said to come from naimo = "herbal medicine", na = "black", nyi = "heaped-up slabs", giving "the mountain of heaped-up slabs of black herbal medicine."

Climbing history 
In 1905, T. G. Longstaff, accompanied by two alpine guides and six porters, made an attempt on Gurla Mandhata. They turned back at around  after being caught in an avalanche and encountering other difficulties. This was a strong achievement for the time, especially for such a small group; at that time no summit of over 7,000 m had yet been climbed and Longstaff's height represented a world altitude record.

In 1935, a Viennese student, Herbert Tichy, disguised as an Indian pilgrim, made a trip to the holy mountain Kailash. On the way, he attempted Gurla Mandhata with one of his porters, Kitar. They reached a height of 23,400  ft. where they were turned back by fresh snow and bad weather.

In 1955 the mountain was the intended destination of the inaugural Welsh Himalayan Expedition, led by Sydney Wignall. The expedition, sponsored by the Liverpool Daily Post, intended to summit Gurla Mandata and plant three flags: the Welsh Dragon, the flag of the recently-overthrown Chinese Republic and the Jolly Roger. Before the climb could begin, the group was captured by the Chinese military who imprisoned and tortured the climbers for two months under the belief they were CIA spies (Wignall had in fact offered to spy for India).

The first ascent of the peak was by a joint Japanese/Chinese team led by Katsutoshi Hirabayashi, via the north side of the peak, in May 1985. Since that time, there have been six additional successful ascents and two failed attempts on the peak.

In 1997, an attempt was made to ascend the peak via the then-unclimbed North Face route by Quinn Simons, Soren Peters, and their guide, Charlie Fowler. The team made a valiant effort, climbing high on the mountain, but after severe storms and other difficulties had to retreat. Their descent ended in a fall of some  down the North Face of the peak. Fowler was slightly injured, while Simons and Peters both suffered extreme frostbite on their extremities.

The standard ascent route climbs the western flanks of the mountain ascending the Chaglung'mlungha Glacier to the summit plateau. Most teams choose to approach the mountain overland by jeep from either Lhasa, Tibet, or Kathmandu, Nepal. However, an alternate approach begins in the mountain hamlet of Simikot, Nepal, in the remote Humla district of west Nepal and follows the Karnali River northward, crossing into Tibet (China) in the village of Sher. Jeeps then take climbers north through Taklakot (Burang) to basecamp on the mountain.

References

External links
 A list of prominent Asian peaks
 Digital Elevation Data (Go to n30e081)
 Historical photo of Gurla Mandhata with Mount Kailas taken from Lipu Pass, on a NASA-related site
 Virtual Aerial Video of Gurla Mandhata 

Mountains of Tibet
Seven-thousanders of the Himalayas